Sabellaria alcocki  is a species of bristle worm described by Charles Joseph Gravier in 1906 and named in honour of Alfred William Alcock.

 Sabellaria alcocki  is included in the genus  Sabellaria  and family Sabellariidae. No subspecies are listed in Catalogue of Life.

References

Sabellida